Page is a unisex given name. People with the name include:

 Page Belcher (1899–1980), American politician
 Page Cavanaugh (1922–2008), American jazz and pop pianist, vocalist and arranger
 Page Cortez (born 1961), American politician and businessman
 Page Falkinburg, Jr. (born 1956), American retired professional wrestler
 Page Fletcher (born 1951), Canadian actor
 Page Hamilton (born 1960), American guitarist, singer, songwriter and record producer, most notably with the alternative metal band Helmet
 Page Hopkins, American journalist
 Page Miller (born 1940), American public historian
 Page McConnell (born 1963), American musician and songwriter, most notably with the American rock band Phish
 Page Pate (1967–2022), American attorney 
 Page Smith (1917–1995), American historian, professor, author and newspaper columnist

See also
 D. Page Elmore (1939–2010), American politician 
 W. Page Keeton (1909–1999), attorney and longtime dean of the University of Texas School of Law
 Paige (name)

Unisex given names